John William Henderson (born March 21, 1943) is a former professional American football player.  He played college football for the University of Michigan in 1963 and 1964 and in the National Football League (NFL) from 1965 to 1972. He was the leading receiver in Super Bowl IV with seven catches for 111 yards.

Henderson was born in Dayton, Ohio, in 1943 and attended Roosevelt High School.  He played college football at the end position for the Michigan Wolverines football team in 1963 and 1964. He gained 330 receiving yards on 27 catches in 1963 and 377 yards on 31 catches in 1964.

Henderson was selected by the Philadelphia Eagles in the fifth round (63rd overall) of the 1965 NFL Draft.  He played eight seasons in the NFL for the Detroit Lions (1965–1967) and the Minnesota Vikings (1968–1972). His best year in the NFL was 1969 when he caught 34 passes for 553 yards and five touches. The Vikings won the 1969 NFL Championship Game and advanced to play the Kansas City Chiefs in Super Bowl IV; Henderson was the game's leading receiver with seven catches for 111 yards. In his eight-year NFL career, Henderson appeared in 93 games and had 108 receptions for 1,735 yards and 10 touchdowns.

References

1943 births
Living people
American football wide receivers
Detroit Lions players
Michigan Wolverines football players
Minnesota Vikings players
Players of American football from Dayton, Ohio